You Never Know Women is a 1926 American silent romantic drama film from director William Wellman that was produced by Famous Players-Lasky and distributed by Paramount Pictures. The stars of the picture are Florence Vidor, Lowell Sherman, and Clive Brook.

Cast
Florence Vidor as Vera
Lowell Sherman as Eugene Foster
Clive Brook as Norodin
El Brendel as Toberchik
Roy Stewart as Dimitri
Joe Bonomo as The Strong Man
Irma Kornelia as Olga
Sidney Bracey as Manager

Preservation
The Library of Congress has a 35mm print of the film.

Kino Classics released a restoration on October 23, 2018. It is available on both Blu-ray and DVD.

References

External links

You Never Know Women at SilentEra

long poster

1926 films
American silent feature films
Famous Players-Lasky films
Films directed by William A. Wellman
Paramount Pictures films
1926 romantic drama films
American romantic drama films
American black-and-white films
Surviving American silent films
1920s American films
Silent romantic drama films
Silent American drama films